"Don't You Want Me" is a song by British synth-pop group the Human League (credited on the cover as The Human League 100). It was released on 27 November 1981 as the fourth single from their third studio album, Dare (1981). The band's best known and most commercially successful song, it was the biggest selling UK single of 1981, that year's Christmas number one, and has since sold over 1,560,000 copies in the UK, making it the 23rd-most successful single in UK Singles Chart history. It topped the Billboard Hot 100 in the US on 3 July 1982, where it stayed for three weeks.

In November 1983, Rolling Stone named it the "breakthrough song" of the Second British Invasion of the US. In 2015, the song was voted by the British public as the nation's seventh-favourite 1980s number one in a poll for ITV. And in 2022, Rolling Stone ranked it one of the 200 Greatest Dance Songs of All Time.

Background

The lyrics were inspired after lead singer Philip Oakey read a photo-story in a teen-girl's magazine. Though the song had been conceived and recorded in the studio as a male solo, Oakey was inspired by the film A Star Is Born and decided to turn the song into a conflicting duet with one of the band's two teenage female vocalists. Susan Ann Sulley was then asked to take on the role. Until then, she and the other female vocalist, Joanne Catherall, had only been assigned backing vocals; Sulley says she was chosen only through "luck of the draw". 

Musicians Jo Callis and Philip Adrian Wright created a synthesizer score to accompany the lyrics that was much harsher than the version that was actually released.  Initial versions of the song were recorded but Virgin Records-appointed producer Martin Rushent was unhappy with them. He and Callis remixed the track, giving it a softer, and in Oakey's opinion, "poppy" sound. Oakey hated the new version and thought it would be the weakest track on Dare, resulting in one of his infamous rows with Rushent. Oakey disliked it so much that it was relegated to the last track on side two of the album.

Before the release of Dare, three of its tracks—"The Sound of the Crowd", "Love Action (I Believe in Love)", and "Open Your Heart"—had already been released as successful singles. With a hit album and three hit singles in a row, Virgin's chief executive Simon Draper decided to release one more single from the album before the end of 1981. His choice, "Don't You Want Me", instantly caused a row with Oakey, who did not want another single to be released because he was convinced that "the public were now sick of hearing" the band and the choice of the "poor quality filler track" would almost certainly be a disaster, wrecking the group's new-found popularity. The band felt the track was "our sort of Des O'Connor song." Virgin were adamant that a fourth single would be released and Oakey finally agreed on the condition that a large colour poster accompany the 7" single, because he felt fans would "feel ripped off" by the 'substandard' single alone.

The Human League often added cryptic references to their productions and the record sleeve of "Don't You Want Me" featured the suffix of "100". This was a reference to The 100 Club, a restaurant/bar in Sheffield.

Reception
In a contemporary review, Record World praised its "throbbing synthesized beat and sharp hook."

Today, the song is widely considered a classic of its era. In a retrospective review, Stephen Thomas Erlewine, senior editor for AllMusic, described the song as "a devastating chronicle of a frayed romance wrapped in the greatest pop hooks and production of its year." Fellow new wave musician Graham Parker praised the song, saying, "I just love that catchy chorus." Oakey still describes it as overrated, but acknowledges his initial dismissal was misguided and claims pride in the track. Oakey has also pointed out another misconception: that it is not a love song, but "a nasty song about sexual power politics."

Chart performance and sales

"Don't You Want Me" was released in the UK on 27 November 1981. The B-side was "Seconds", another track lifted straight from the Dare album. As with previous singles, a 12" version was also issued featuring the original version of "Don't You Want Me" and "Seconds" on the A-side and an "extended dance mix" lasting seven and a half minutes on the B-side. This mix is also featured on the Love and Dancing album that was released under the name of the League Unlimited Orchestra in 1982.

To the amazement of the band (and especially Oakey), the song entered the UK Singles Chart at #9 and shot to #1 the following week, remaining there over the Christmas period for a total of five weeks. It ultimately became the biggest-selling single to be released in 1981, and the fifth biggest-selling single of the entire decade. Its success was repeated six months later in the US, with "Don't You Want Me" hitting #1 on the Billboard Hot 100 for three weeks. Billboard magazine ranked it as the sixth-biggest hit of 1982. The single was certified Gold by the RIAA the same year for sales of a million copies. "Don't You Want Me" is notable as the first song featuring the revolutionary Linn LM-1 drum machine to hit #1 on the UK charts and also the first LM-1 track to top the Billboard Hot 100.

After the band scored a number of hits for Warner's eastwest label, the song was remixed and issued by Virgin as a CD, cassette and 12" single in October 1995. This version featured new remixes by Hooj Choons' Red Jerry and German Eurodance duo Snap!, and would peak at #16 on the UK singles chart. The release coincided with the issue of the group's second Greatest Hits compilation album shortly afterwards (which featured the Snap 7 inch remix), while the main 7 inch remix by Red Jerry was put on NOW 32 by Virgin/EMI/Polygram, alongside dance acts like Goldie, Candy Girls and Wildchild.

As of November 2012, "Don't You Want Me" was the 23rd best-selling single in the UK, with 1.55 million copies sold. On 23 March 2014, the song re-entered the UK Singles Chart at #19 and debuted at #1 in the Scottish singles charts thanks to a social media campaign by fans of Aberdeen Football Club. In 2017 it was reported to be the 43rd most successful single in UK chart history with sales and streams combined.

In 2021, Viacom International Studios put into production a music chart programme called The 80s Greatest Hits 1980-1989 for Channel 5 and asked the Official Charts Company (OCC) to provide the countdowns for the series, based on the best-selling singles for each year. When the 1981 episode was broadcast (now under the title of Britain's Favourite 80's Songs) "Don't You Want Me" was placed at number one, with the OCC now confirming it was the official best-selling song of 1981 with an estimated 1.15 million sales (previously the title had gone to "Tainted Love" by Soft Cell, which now has been put in second place with 1.05 million sales).

Music video

In 1981, record company Virgin were becoming aware that the promotional music video was evolving into an important marketing tool, with MTV being launched that year. Because it was agreed that the video for "Open Your Heart" had looked "cheap and nasty", Virgin commissioned a much more elaborate and expensive promotional video for "Don't You Want Me".

The video for the song was filmed near Slough, Berkshire, during November 1981 and has the theme of the filming and editing of a murder-mystery film, featuring the band members as characters and production staff. Because it is a "making-of" video, both crew and camera apparatus appear throughout. The video was conceived and directed by the Irish filmmaker Steve Barron, and has at its core the interaction between a successful actress (also an assistant editor) played by Susan Ann Sulley walking out on "film director" Philip Oakey on a film set. It is loosely based on the film A Star Is Born. Near the end of the video, Wright, who also plays a film editor, has an expression on his face while the camera pulls back to reveal that the cutting room where Oakey, Wright and Sulley were working is yet another set (the camera can be seen in the mirror's reflection).

Filmed on a cold, wet winter night, the video was shot on 35mm film instead of the cheaper videotape prevalent at the time. Sulley claims that Barron was heavily influenced by the cinematography in Ultravox's video for "Vienna" (directed by Russell Mulcahy earlier that year). Barron was also influenced by François Truffaut and his film Day for Night, and, because of that, the clapperboard seen in the video bears the inscription "Le League Humaine" as a tribute to Truffaut.

The video is credited for making Oakey, Sulley and Catherall visual icons of the early 1980s. One car used in the video is a gold W-reg (1981–82) Rover SD1 carrying the registration plate "GCK 68W". DVLA records show that this car's last period of Vehicle Excise Duty expired on 24 April 1992. In a 1995 interview, Catherall mentioned that the car Callis was driving had to be pushed into shot as he could not drive at the time, to which Sulley added "he still can't!"

The video was released in December 1981.

Track listing

1981 release
 7" vinyl (Virgin VS466)
"Don't You Want Me" – 3:57
"Seconds" – 4:59

 12" vinyl (Virgin VS466-12)
"Don't You Want Me" – 3:57
"Seconds" – 4:59
"Don't You Want Me (Ext. Dance Mix)" – 7:30

1995 release
 CD (Virgin VSCDT1557)
 "Don't You Want Me (Red Jerry 7" Remix)" - 3:43
 "Don't You Want Me (Snap 7" Remix)" - 3:58
 "Don't You Want Me (Red Jerry 12" Remix)" - 6:11
 "Don't You Want Me (Snap 12" Extended Remix)" - 6:14
 "Don't You Want Me (Red Jerry Dub Mix)" - 7:01
 "Don't You Want Me (Original Version)" - 3:57

 12" vinyl (Virgin VST1557)
 "Don't You Want Me (Snap 12" Extended Remix)" - 6:12
 "Don't You Want Me (Red Jerry 12" Remix)" - 6:09

 Cassette (Virgin VSC 1557)
 "Don't You Want Me (Red Jerry 7" Remix)" - 3:43
 "Don't You Want Me (Snap 7" Remix)" - 3:58
 "Don't You Want Me (Red Jerry 12" Remix)" - 6:11
 "Don't You Want Me (Original Version)" - 3:57

Charts

Weekly charts

1995 remixes

2014 re-entry

Year-end charts

All-time charts

Sales and certifications

Mandy Smith version  

In 1989, English pop singer Mandy covered this song under the title of "Don't You Want Me Baby". Released as a standalone single after her only album, Mandy (1988), it was also Smith's final single and became her only single to hit the UK top 75, peaking at No. 59. The B-side, "If It Makes You Feel Good", featured on the album. The song was included as a bonus track on the 2009 reissue of her album.

Track listings
 CD single
 "Don't You Want Me Baby"
 "If It Makes You Feel Good"
 "Don't You Want Me Baby" (Cocktail Mix)
 "If It Makes You Feel Good" (Extended Version)

 7" single
 "Don't You Want Me Baby"
 "If It Makes You Feel Good"

 12" single
 "Don't You Want Me Baby" (Cocktail Mix)
 "If It Makes You Feel Good" (Extended Version)

Charts

The Farm version

British band the Farm released a cover of "Don't You Want Me" in October 1992 that reached number 18 on the UK Singles Charts making it their third-highest-chart single after 1990's "All Together Now" and "Groovy Train". It was originally recorded for the NME charity album Ruby Trax.

An uncredited female singer sings lead vocal on the second verse, as sung by Susanne Sulley in the original version. The accompanying music video features former Manchester United footballer George Best mouthing along to the chorus.

Track listings
 CD single
 "Don't You Want Me"
 "Don't You Want Me" (Premier mix)
 "Obviously"
 "Groovy Train" (alternative mix)

7-inch single
 "Don't You Want Me"
 "Obviously"

 12-inch single
 "Don't You Want Me" (Premier mix)
 "Don't You Want Me" (20K mix)
 "Don't You Want Me" (Pickles Keef mix)
 "Groovy Train" (alternative mix)

Alcazar version

"Don't You Want Me" was recorded as a Eurodance song by Swedish band Alcazar, released internationally in 2002. The song was included in the European version of their debut album, Casino (2000) together with a few others. It was recorded in Stockholm at first, but when the band wanted it for a new pan-European single, a new version was made.

The single was released in Australia as a follow-up to the successful single "Crying at the Discoteque". The white 12-inch was released in Europe and distributed to DJs to get maximum airplay at the disco arenas.

"Don't You Want Me" is Alcazar's biggest hit in the United States with 15 weeks on the Billboard Hot 100 chart, peaking at #30.

Music video
The accompanying music video for "Don't You Want Me" was filmed at Filmhuset in Stockholm, and was directed by Jesper Ganslandt. The video takes place in "Circus Alcazar" and is filled with horses, ducks, an evil parrot, acrobats, the Alcazar ballet (including a dog in a pink ballerina dress) and Annikafiore's boyfriend juggling with fire in the background. The video shoot took almost 23 hours.

Track listing
 CD single
"Almighty Radio Edit" – 3:27
"Almighty Club Mix" – 7:25
"Project Eden Remix" – 7:34
"Earth Club Anthem" – 10:24
"Wild Cowboys Radio Mix" – 3:38

Charts

See also
List of Billboard Hot 100 number-one singles of 1982

References

External links
 
 "Don't You Want Me" at The Black Hit of Space.dk
 

1981 songs
1981 singles
1982 singles
1989 singles
2002 singles
The Human League songs
The Farm (British band) songs
Alcazar (band) songs
Billboard Hot 100 number-one singles
Cashbox number-one singles
Number-one singles in Israel
Number-one singles in New Zealand
Number-one singles in Norway
Number-one singles in Scotland
RPM Top Singles number-one singles
UK Singles Chart number-one singles
Male–female vocal duets
Songs written by Philip Oakey
Song recordings produced by Martin Rushent
Music videos directed by Steve Barron
Virgin Records singles
Pete Waterman Entertainment singles
RCA Records singles
Bertelsmann Music Group singles
Songs written by Jo Callis
Songs written by Philip Adrian Wright
Christmas number-one singles in the United Kingdom